Rajpunyah is a conventional celebration where the people of the Chittagong Hill Tracts, Bangladesh, assemble to pay taxes to their king (circle head). This festival takes place after every five or six years, though it used to take place every year previously. Following this occasion, a folk fair starts and goes on for three days. Thousands of local and foreign tourists visit Bandarban every year during the festival.

History 
The Bohmong kings have been organizing the Rajpunyah Festival since 1875 AD to collect Jhum tax. The ninth Bohmong king started the formal tax collection in 1875. However, after the death of the 14th Bohmong King Manshaiprue Chowdhury in the 1990s, Rajpunyah did not take place for two years. Rajpunyah Festival has been much enhanced in the last 134 years assimilating different cultural aspects of different people living in the Chittagong Hill Tracts. For the people of the hill districts, Rajpunyah is one of the biggest festivals at present.

Place 
The Chakma circle celebrates Rajpunyah in Rangamati. On the other hand, the Bohmong circle arranges Rajpunyah in Bandarban. Different indigenous people come to see the king with great interest from different places.

Festival 
The Rajpunyah festival was first introduced during British rule. Rajpunyah is better known as ‘Poingjara Powaye’ to various local tribal communities. According to the hill tradition of about two hundred years, the king collects taxes by organizing a fair at the beginning of the year. At the Rajpunyah ceremony, the headmen of the mouzas under the king paid tribute to him and expressed their allegiance.  Later the king addresses the people and rewards the tribals who have contributed in various fields.

The king ascends the royal throne through thousands of flower rugs. Later, one by one, the king receives taxes and various gifts from the people. Every year in Bandarban, during Rajpunyah, the courtyard of the palace becomes a unique gathering place for the indigenous people and the Bengalis. Not only has the people of Bandarban, Rangamati, but also Rajpunyah fair attracted thousands of domestic and foreign tourists. As a result, there is an acute seat crisis in hotels and motels in Bandarban during Rajpunyah. This traditional fair of the hill has circus, puppet dance, indigenous instrumental music, dance, song, drama staging and the whirligigs. Besides, businessmen set up hundreds of shops with different products.

References 

Festivals of Bangladeshi culture
Chittagong Hill Tracts
Festivals in Bangladesh